Dejiang County is a county under the administration of the prefecture-level city of Tongren, in the northeast of Guizhou Province, China.

Area: 

Population: 420,000 in 2002.

Postal Code: 565200.

The government is located in Qinlong town.

Climate

References

External links
Official website of Dejiang County Government

 
County-level divisions of Guizhou